The Arabian wolf (Canis lupus arabs) is a subspecies of gray wolf native to the Arabian Peninsula, the Negev Desert, the Sinai Peninsula, and Jordan. It is the smallest wolf subspecies, and a desert-adapted subspecies that normally lives in small groups. It is omnivorous, eating small to medium-sized prey.

Taxonomy
Once thought to be synonymous with C. l. pallipes (the Indian wolf), the Arabian wolf was designated Canis lupus arabs by the British zoologist Reginald Innes Pocock in 1934. Pocock noted its smaller skull and smaller size. In the third edition of Mammal Species of the World published in 2005, the mammalogist W. Christopher Wozencraft listed under the wolf Canis lupus the subspecies Canis lupus arabs. A 2014 study suggests that genetically the Arabian wolf is closer to C. l. lupus than it is to C. l. pallipes and supports the subspecies designation C. l. arabs. There has been admixture with domestic dogs, but it is unclear whether or not this is why this wolf is genetically closer to C. l. lupus. This raises a concern of extinction by hybridization as Arabian wolves are more adapted to desert life than wolf/dog hybrids.

In Israel and Palestine, there is some disagreement as to the exact taxonomic status of wolves. Some scientists hold that two subspecies of wolf are present- C. l. pallipes in the northern parts, and C. l. arabs in the south. They point out that the southern wolves are smaller than the northern wolves which are also darker and have longer fur. Other scientists consider the wolf in the area to be C. l. arabs, with no real distinction between northern and southern wolves. As in other countries, there is interbreeding with feral dogs, which adds an element of uncertainty.

Admixture with other Canis species
In 2018, whole genome sequencing was used to compare members of the genus Canis. The study found evidence of gene flow between African golden wolves, golden jackals, and grey wolves (from Saudi Arabia and Syria). One African golden wolf from the Egyptian Sinai Peninsula showed high admixture with the Middle Eastern grey wolves and dogs, highlighting the role of the land bridge between the African and Eurasian continents in canid evolution. The African golden wolf was found to be the descendant of a genetically admixed canid of 72% grey wolf and 28% Ethiopian wolf ancestry.

Description

The Arabian wolf is one of the smallest subspecies of wolf. The cranial length of the adult Arabian wolf measures on average , which is smaller than most wolves. Along with the Indian wolf, it is probably smaller than other wolves to help it adapt to life in a hot, dry climate. This is an example of Bergmann's rule, where mammal size varies by the warmth of their environment. Its ears are proportionally larger in relation to its body size when compared to other sub-species of Canis lupus, an adaptation probably developed to help disperse body heat (Allen's Rule). Arabian wolves do not usually live in large packs, and instead hunt in pairs or in groups of about three or four animals. They have a short thin coat which is usually a grayish beige color, "... a mixture of black and slightly buffy grey" according to Pocock. Similar to other canines, the Arabian wolf does not have sweat glands and so it must control its body temperature by rapid panting, which causes evaporation from the lungs. Occasionally the pads of the third and fourth toes are fused in the back; a feature which differentiates its tracks from a dog's. It is distinguished from the Indian wolf by its smaller skull, smaller size and thinner coat.

Ecology

Diet 
Arabian wolves are mainly carnivorous, but also omnivorous and in some areas largely dependent on human garbage and excess products. Their native prey includes ungulates such as Nubian ibex, gazelles, and Asiatic wild ass, as well as smaller animals like hares and rodents. They also eat cats, sweet fruits, roadkill and other carrion. Opportunistically, almost any small animal including fish, snails, baby baboons can be part of their diet.  Because Arabian wolves can attack and eat any domestic animals up to the size of a goat, Bedouins and farmers will not hesitate to shoot, poison, or trap them.

Other wildlife interactions 
There is at least one case in Israel of a striped hyena associating and cooperating with a wolf pack. It is proposed that this is a case of mutualism: the hyena could benefit from the wolves' superior ability to hunt large, agile prey. The wolves could benefit from the hyena's superior sense of smell, to locate and dig out tortoises, to crack open large bones, and to tear open discarded food containers like tin cans.

As with other wolf subspecies, Arabian wolves can facilitate a trophic cascade by suppressing smaller carnivores such as golden jackals and foxes. This allows smaller herbivores to become more abundant.

Range and conservation

The Arabian wolf was once found throughout the Arabian Peninsula, but now lives only in small pockets in southern Israel, Palestine, southern and western Iraq, Oman, Yemen, Jordan, Saudi Arabia, and some parts of the Sinai Peninsula in Egypt. It is rare throughout most of its range because of human persecution. 

In Oman, wolf populations have increased because of a ban on hunting, and they may naturally re-establish themselves in certain places within the region in the relatively near term. 

In Israel, between 100 and 150 Arabian wolves are found across the Negev and the Arava. The population is stable, as prey is abundant and much of the land is undeveloped and protected as nature reserves. They are strongly protected under Israel's 1955 Wildlife Protection Law. 

The United Arab Emirates and Egypt both have a captive breeding program, and the wolf is protected in Oman and Israel, but elsewhere, its future is uncertain. 

In Saudi Arabia, the wolf is protected in places and still exists in places with sparse human activity.

References

Sources
 

Mammals of the Arabian Peninsula
Carnivorans of Asia
Vertebrates of Israel
Subspecies of Canis lupus
Mammals described in 1934